The Midnight Sons is a 1909 American musical comedy that was popular upon its release.

The music was by Raymond Hubbell with a book by Glen MacDonough.   Opening on May 22, 1909, it ran for 257 performances at the old Broadway Theatre in New York City.

Plot
Senator Constant Noyes has four sons who are compelled to find jobs, and the loose plot follows these attempts.

Act 2 opened with the audience facing a false theater set filled with actors and wax dummies, before which the cast would give little performances with their back to the real audience.  The set audience included likenesses of famous New Yorkers including theatre critics.  Arthur Voegtlin was the set designer.

Blanche Ring's performance of I've Got Rings On My Fingers (And Bells On My Toes) became the hit of the show.

Reception
Staged by Lew Fields as a "summer" offering, it had preview performances outside New York and  play opened on May 22, 1909, at the old Broadway Theatre.

The play was quite popular with audiences and critics.  After running for 257 performances on Broadway, it went on tour starting on January 1, 1910.  After cast member Lotta Faust died in early 1910 of pneumonia, a benefit performance of the play was performed at the Broadway in May 1910 for her mother.

Broadway cast
 Senator Constant Noyes ... George A. Schiller
 Jack ... Joseph M. Ratliff
 Dick .... Harry Fisher
 Harry ... Denman Maley
 Tom ... Fritz Williams
 Merri Murray ... Lotta Faust
 Rose Raglan ... Norma Brown
 Claire Voyant ... Linden Beckwith
 Pansy Burns ... George Monroe
 Lily Burns ... Lillian Lee
 A. Case Daly ... Taylor Holmes
 Souseberry Lushmore ... Vernon Castle
 Miss Beatrice Ballast ... Blanche Sherwood
 Lady Fire Fly ... Gladys Moore
 Mlle De Leon ... Maybelle Meeker
 The Cynical Owl ... Berchard Dickerson
 The Baby Owl ... Johnnie Hines
 Mercedes Panhard ... Nan J. Brennan
 Katherine Knockwell ... Florence Cable
 Mrs. Carrie Margin ... Blanche Ring

Other
F. Scott Fitzgerald references the musical in his 1928 short story "The Captured Shadow", describing a sheet music cover from the play with "three men in evening clothes and opera hats sauntering jovially along Broadway." One of these men would have been dancer Vernon Castle.

References

External links

 The Midnight Sons at Internet Broadway Database
 I've got rings on my fingers, recordings at the Library of Congress, including 1909 recording by Blanche Ring

1909 musicals
Broadway musicals